This is a list of the highest-grossing R-rated films. An R-rated film is a film that has been assessed as having material which may be unsuitable for children under the age of 17 by the Motion Picture Association; the MPA writes "Under 17 requires accompanying parent or adult guardian". The R-rating applies to the United States, with similar ratings given in TV-MA for television and home-video releases, as well as other countries such as 18A in Canada and 15 or 18 in the United Kingdom.

Highest-grossing R-rated films

The following is the top 50 highest grossing R-rated films of all time. Only Joker sits along the highest grossing films of all time. 2003 has the most films in the top 50 with 4 films.

Highest-grossing R-rated and TV-MA animated films 
The following is a list of R-rated and TV-MA rated adult animated films that has surpass $1 million at the box office. 2016 is the most frequent year with two films, 67.7% of films were released after 2000.

Highest-grossing R-rated films by year

Timeline of highest-grossing R-rated films
At least thirteen films have held the record of highest-grossing R-rated film at a certain time.  The Godfather is the only R-rated film to become the highest-grossing film irrespective of the rating.

**Deadpool 2 got the record when it was re-released in 2018. The film grossed $734,546,611 in its initial release

Top 25 highest grossing R-rated film series and franchises
Some of the listed franchises have also released films with other ratings. Only R-rated films are included here. A franchise must have at least two R-rated films to be listed.

See also
 Lists of highest-grossing films
 List of highest-grossing horror films

Notes

References

External links
 

R-rated
R-rated